Himayatnagar may refer to:

 Himayatnagar, Ranga Reddy district: A village of Rangareddy District in Telangana, India
 Himayatnagar, Maharashtra: A tehsil of Nanded District in Maharashtra, India
 Himayatnagar, Hyderabad: A suburb of the city of Hyderabad, Telangana, India

See also
 Himayathnagar (disambiguation)